The Deccan Chargers (DC) were a franchise cricket team based in Hyderabad, India, that competed in the Indian Premier League (IPL), a professional Twenty20 cricket (T20) league in India. They were one of the eight teams that competed in the 2010 Indian Premier League, making their third appearance in all IPL tournaments. The team was captained by Adam Gilchrist and coached by Darren Lehmann with Kanwaljit Singh and Mike Young as assistant coaches.

They began their season by losing their opening fixture of the IPL on 12 March against the Kolkata Knight Riders but five consecutive wins at the end of the group stage helped them to qualify for the semi-finals. They lost to Chennai Super Kings by 38 runs in the semi-final and to Royal Challengers Bangalore by 9 wickets in the third-place playoff to finish the tournament at fourth and failed to qualify for the 2010 Champions League Twenty20.

Player Acquisition

Players retained: Azhar Bilakhia, Ravi Teja Dwaraka, Herschelle Gibbs, Adam Gilchrist, Ryan Harris, Pragyan Ojha, Rohit Sharma, Jaskaran Singh, R. P. Singh, Dwayne Smith, Andrew Symonds, Suman Tirumalasetti, V. V. S. Laxman, Chaminda Vaas, Arjun Yadav, Venugopal Rao Yalaka

Players released: Shoaib Ahmed, Harmeet Singh Bansal, Manvinder Bisla, Halhadar Das, Kalyankrishna Doddapaneni, Fidel Edwards, Abhinav Kumar, Sarvesh Kumar, Vijaykumar Paidikalva, Chamara Silva, Scott Styris, Nuwan Zoysa

Players added: Harmeet Singh Bansal, Sumanth Bodapati, Mitchell Marsh, Mohnish Mishra, Ashish Reddy, Kemar Roach, Rahul Sharma, Anirudh Singh

Squad
 Players with international caps are listed in bold.
 Year signed denotes the season the player signed for the team

Kit manufacturers and sponsors

Season Overview

Standings

Results by match

Fixtures

All times are in Indian Standard Time (UTC+05:30)

Group stage

Knockout stage
Semi-Final

Third-place playoff

Statistics

Source: 2010 IPL Statistics Full Table on Cricinfo

Awards and achievements

Awards
Man of the Match

Season Awards
 Winner of the Purple Cap : Pragyan Ojha

Achievements
 Most maiden overs bowled in the 2010 IPL : Chaminda Vaas (2)
 Best bowling strike-rate in the 2010 IPL : Ryan Harris (13.14)

Notes

Footnotes

References

External links

2010 Indian Premier League
Indian Premier League
Cricket in Hyderabad, India